Abdallah Barkat Ibrahim is a Djiboutian politician. He served as a member of the Pan-African Parliament representing Djibouti and the Parliament of Djibouti as the Chairman of the Committee on Legislation, General Administration and Human Rights.

References

Year of birth missing (living people)
Living people
Djiboutian politicians
Members of the Pan-African Parliament from Djibouti